The Vaganova method is a ballet technique and training system devised by the Russian dancer and pedagogue Agrippina Vaganova (1879–1951). It was derived from the teachings of the Premier Maître de Ballet Marius Petipa, throughout the late 19th century. It was Agrippa Vaganova who perfected and cultivated this form of teaching classical ballet and turned it into a viable syllabus. The method fuses elements of traditional French style from the romantic era with the athleticism and virtuosity of Italian Cecchetti technique. The training system is designed to involve the whole body in every movement, with equal attention paid to the upper body, legs and feet. Vaganova believed that this approach increases consciousness of the body, thus creating a harmony of movement and greater expressive range.

History
Upon graduating from the Imperial Ballet School in Saint Petersburg in 1897, Agrippina Vaganova began dancing with the school's associated professional company, the Imperial Russian Ballet. She retired from dancing in 1916 to pursue a teaching career and in 1921 returned as a teacher at the school, which had been renamed the Leningrad Choreographic School.

During the 30 years she spent teaching at the Leningrad Choreographic School, Vaganova developed a ballet technique that combined elements of French, Italian, and earlier Russian technique, and a training method to teach the technique. Tenets of the training method included development of lower back strength and arm plasticity, and the strength, flexibility and endurance required for ballet, and it incorporated a detailed instruction process that specified when to teach each topic and how long to teach it. In 1934, Vaganova wrote Fundamentals of the Classical Dance, which remains a standard textbook for the instruction of ballet technique. In 1948, Vaganova authored a book titled The Foundation For Dance (more commonly known as Basic Principles of Russian Classical Dance) that outlined her training method and ballet technique. Following Vaganova's death in 1951, her teaching method was preserved by instructors such as Vera Kostrovitskaya and Vera Volkova.

Today the Vaganova method is the most widely used ballet teaching method in Russia, and it is also used in Europe and North America.

Characteristics
The Vaganova training method relies on the following principle: That all training can be encompassed and displayed in the course of one grand pas de deux. Students are trained to prove this principle upon graduation, thus the reason for graduation performances in which the most talented students are given a grand pas de deux to perform.

The steps in Vaganova's syllabus builds on a carefully developed progression in which the "basic" or "preparatory" forms are mastered before the dancer moves on to more difficult forms. This can be understood as a codified technical approach when taught by qualified teachers following the syllabus closely. The syllabus is founded upon the idea that when a dancer is introduced to a step, he or she will have developed the correct strength in foundation in order for their steps and movements to be successful. It is understood that this strength-building requires time and consistent hard work.

Students at Vaganova-based schools are expected to take daily courses in ballet as well as character dance, modern dance, calisthenics/strengthening, and study dance history, music, and language. Ballet demands versatility and ballet students cannot rely solely on the study of classical ballet.

Terminology used in the Vaganova method often differs from other methods, and may also vary by locale. For example, the Vaganova "grand pas de chat" is commonly called "saut de chat" in the United States, and Vaganova's "battement jeté" is often called "dégagé" in other methods.

Students at Vaganova-based pre-professional schools are expected to also take courses in choreography and pedagogy. These two subjects allow students of all abilities to go on to become both choreographers and well trained teachers. Frequently, students who do not pass exams for their grade in ballet are redirected into training as choreographers and teachers. This is unique to Vaganova training, as other schools focus solely on a future in dancing.

References

External links
 
 About the Vaganova Syllabus

Ballet training methods